Dynamo is the sixth studio album by Argentinian rock band Soda Stereo. It was first released in Argentina on 26 October 1992 by Sony Music Argentina.

Considered one of the most essential shoegazing albums (and Hispanic shoegaze's high point by critics and fans alike), this is a very modern release that might have been accepted in anglophone music, and was quite visionary for its era. The album also continued the evolution of musical style the band previously went through with their 1990 album, Canción Animal. This album may also be considered one of the band's most mature and revolutionary releases.

A highly experimental record, Dynamo failed to reach its predecessor's popularity due to many factors, including lack of support from the band's label. It also alienated many fans, who had a hard time coping with the unexpected shift in the band's musical style. Nevertheless, a few songs received a fair amount of radio airplay, including "Primavera 0" and "Luna Roja".

The release of Dynamo prompted a nationwide tour, including a six night residency at Arena Obras Sanitarias, then known as the "Temple of Rock" by the local press. The band invited several up-and-coming bands from the alternative scene such as Babasónicos, Juana La Loca and Martes Menta to fill the support slots at those concerts, thus giving exposure to a scene that would become influential (and in some cases commercially successful) over the years. In this respect it can be argued that in spite of an apparent commercial failure (it went Double Platinum within a few weeks), Soda Stereo were never as influential on the development of new bands as in the Dynamo era. It also established the band as a sort of forefathers of the 90s alternative scene in Argentina, even when their role was mostly as propagandists of sorts.

Background and recording
Following the release of Soda Stereo's critically acclaimed fifth studio album Canción animal in 1990, Soda was propelled to international recognition, particularly with their rock anthem "De música ligera", which received vast airplay across Argentina. Shortly after the album's release, Soda embarked on an 81-show tour around Latin America and Spain, called Gira Animal.

In 1991, lead singer, guitarist and frontman Gustavo Cerati began a musical partnership with Daniel Melero of Argentine band Los Encargados, a longtime friend of Cerati's, previous collaborator of Soda Stereo's and lover of electronic music. Cerati found the change in genre especially constructive for composing songs and began honing the art of sampling, buying an Akai MPC and composing sample-based songs with Melero in Estudios Supersónico. This partnership would eventually culminate in the release of the Rex Mix EP (1991), as well as a Cerati-Melero collaboration, Colores santos, in 1992, both of which draw heavy sonic influence from electronic music, the Madchester scene in the United Kingdom, and neo-psychedelia.

Exasperated by their old material, Soda had already begun working on new music towards the tailend of the Gira animal tour, after a brief pause in touring. Cerati said, "We made the decision to distance ourselves a little, to do other things, to open our heads a little bit, to travel and to get together when it was right. That's how it was." On top of Cerati's aforementioned influences coming into songwriting sessions, Soda also grew interested in alternative rock, impressed by the works of British shoegazing and dream pop bands such as My Bloody Valentine, Ultra Vivid Scene, Sonic Youth, Ride, Primal Scream, Spiritualized, and Lush. Immediately following the culmination of the tour in May 1992 by way of six shows in Spain, Soda Stereo began work on a new album, tentatively titled Gol, but renamed Dynamo after Melero made a comment about old bicycles having dynamos. Two of the three songs composed exclusively by Cerati, "En remolinos" and "Primavera 0", had allegedly already been written by the time the group returned to Buenos Aires. According to Cerati, much of the album's material was composed in jams and rehearsals, with the audio recorded in stereo and saved onto DAT's. Other songs, such as "Texturas", were based on old songs from the band's beginnings. Eventually, Cerati states, "twenty-something" songs were written for the album. Many of the rejects for Dynamo ended up on other albums; the song "Rombos", from Cerati's solo album "Amor Amarillo" (1993), was first written by Cerati for Dynamo, and documentary footage by Boy Olmi taken from the recording sessions shows Cerati playing the song to Bosio on his MPC. Other songs, such as "Zona de promesas", "Ángel eléctrico", and "Planeador", ended up on subsequent Soda projects.

Recording began in August 1992 in Estudios Supersónico in Buenos Aires, near Belgrano. Most of the lyrics were written in-studio, to the melodies. Meticulous about the album's sound, Cerati wished to "deform" the album sonically by constructing shoegaze-reminiscent walls of sound, while keeping the vocals in the foreground and executing powerful choruses characteristic of Soda's "heroic" trademark sound. In turn, he dominated the atmosphere of the studio vision-wise. In keeping with the album's electronic theme, songs such as "Camaleón", "Sweet sahumerio", "Ameba", "Nuestra fe", and "Claroscuro" were built around loops, synthesisers, and samplers such as Cerati's MPC60. Cerati, Bosio, and Melero contributed extensively to the album's artistic production. The recording sessions for the album took a notably experimental direction compared to past albums; for inspiration, the crew recorded raga rock track "Sweet sahumerio" by holding an impromptu yoga class in the studio with Cerati's personal yoga trainer, and for the first time, enlisted the help of a local Hindu music band for instrumentation, including tabla, tambura, and sitar. Track 5, "Camaleón", was recorded in an unusual setup, with Cerati on bass guitar and Bosio on electric guitar (minus the solo at the end). Recording for the album culminated the following month with the recording of fifth single "Claroscuro".

Composition

Music

Dynamo showed a complete turnaround in the band's sound, headed towards a more alternative style. It is primarily a shoegaze and alternative rock album,
 while at the same time delving into neo-psychedelia, dream pop, noise rock, alternative dance, baggy, raga rock, and electronic music. The band wished for Dynamo to be eclectic in style, and tried to accentuate it by being as daring as possible with the genres they implemented, structuring the songs so that they contrasted with each other. Cerati saw this musical contrast as an allegory of the band's relationship at the moment the album was recorded.

According to Cerati, the sudden departure in style of Dynamo from the more accessible hard rock of Canción animal came as a result of internal strains within the band stemming from the album's massive success. Cerati states that the band, "... decided to change [its] direction because we didn't want to keep inflating the monster that we'd created. We were fed up with the band, and I personally had little desire to continue, but after Spain we decided to face the challenge of not losing desire to keep making music."

Release
Dynamo was released in October 1992 in Latin America on cassette, compact disc, and vinyl. The Gira Dynamo began on 27 November 1992 with a presentation on the Argentine talk show Fax, and venue shows began in December 1992 in Buenos Aires. Throughout their shortened 31-show tour, Soda played in five countries: Argentina, Chile, Mexico, Paraguay, and Venezuela. Likely due to the album's low profile, television exposure of the shows was limited, and few audio and video recordings exist of the tour. Following news that Cerati's then-girlfriend Cecilia Amenábar was expecting their first child, the rest of the tour was cut short after a concert in Mexico City on 21 March 1993, as Cerati moved to Santiago to be with Amenábar and record Amor amarillo, his first solo venture. This initiated an extended two-year hiatus of the band, which would only be interrupted by the 1995 release of Sueño Stereo, the band's final studio album. Shortly following the end of the tour, Soda Stereo became embroiled in a bitter legal battle with its label, Sony Music, and eventually left the label to sign with Ariola (then a subsidiary of BMG).

In 1993, Soda released Zona de promesas, their third and final EP. The album contains several outtakes and remixes from Dynamo, including the titular B-side and several concert remixes of their past tracks.

The cover art and album design for Dynamo was created by Argentine graphic designers Gabriela Malerba and Alejandro Ros, who had been responsible for all of the band's cover art from Rex Mix onward. On the cover, the letters in Soda Stereo's name are stylised with numbers. According to Ros, the distinctive "heart" on the cover is actually a flower stand pinched to resemble a heart. Malerba and Ros made sure to particularly stress the album's theme of love in the art, with Ros stating that, "The idea of this album was love, the universe, conflict, and the pain that love entails." Ros states that the duo also wished to play with the idea of perspective, particularly how the latter can change one's perception and understanding of things and emotions. Ros attributes the duo's implementation of miniature planets to this concept.

Legacy
Dynamo is often compared to My Bloody Valentine's seminal album Loveless. Some critics refer to Dynamo as a kind of "hispanic Loveless". While both share multiple musical traits, Loveless was conceived in a culture that was experiencing a rise of alternative genres; Dynamo in turn, was released in the highly conservative Latin American music scene.

Track listing

Personnel
Soda Stereo
 Gustavo Cerati – lead vocals / guitars / MPC60 / keyboards / producer / programming
 Zeta Bosio – bass guitar / backing vocals / producer
 Charly Alberti – drums / percussion

Additional personnel
 Daniel Melero: sampler and keyboards, collaboration producer
 Tweety González: sampler
 Flavio Etcheto: trumpet
 Sanjay Bhadoriya: tabla (on "Sweet Sahumerio") and Padanth Voice (on "Camaleón")
 Eduardo Blacher: tambura (on "Sweet Sahumerio")
 Roberto Zuczer: sitar

References

External links
 Lyrics

1992 albums
Soda Stereo albums
Experimental rock albums by Argentine artists
Shoegaze albums by Argentine artists
Sony Music Argentina albums